A Place Called Love is the second studio album by American country music artist Judy Rodman. It was issued under MTM Records in 1987, and was the final studio album Rodman would issue during her music career.

Background
A Place Called Love was the second issued album Rodman made under MTM. It spawned three singles that each became major hits on the Billboard Country Chart. The first single, "Girls Ride Horses Too" reached the Top 10, as well as the second single, "I'll Be Your Baby Tonight" (a cover of the Bob Dylan song). The third single, "I Want a Love Like That" peaked within the Top 20, becoming her last Top 40 entry. The album was issued in 1987 following her previous album the year before entitled, Judy.

A Place Called Love peaked at #29 on the Top Country Albums chart following its release in 1987.
The album was reviewed by Allmusic, who gave it three out of five stars.
This was only one of two albums that Rodman would issue during her music career. Her third album, Goin' to Work was expected to be released in 1988, but was not released due to the label's closure.

Track listing

Personnel
 George Binkley — violin
 Pete Bordonali —electric guitar, mandolin
 John Borg — viola
 Mark Casstevens — acoustic guitar
 Roy Christensen — viola, cello
 David Davidson — violin
 Al Delroy — strings arranger, conductor
 Sonny Garrish — pedal steel guitar
 Steve Gibson — acoustic guitar
 John Goin — acoustic guitar
 Carl Gorodetzky — violin
 Shane Keister — keyboards
 Janis Ian — background vocals
 Mary Ann Kennedy — background vocals
 Lee Larrison — violin
 Larrie Londin — drums
 Ted Madsen — violin
 Phyllis Mazza — violin
 Peter McHugh — violin
 Dennis Molchan — violin
 Farrell Morris — percussion
 Mark O'Connor — fiddle
 Judy Rodman — lead vocals, guitar
 Pam Rose — background vocals
 Brent Rowan — acoustic guitar
 Steve Schaffer — bass
 Thom Schuyler — background vocals
 Lisa Silver — background vocals
 Pamela Sixfin — violin
 James Stroud — drums
 Wendy Suits — background vocals
 Bobby Taylor — oboe
 Bergan White — strings arranger, conductor
 Tommy West — producer, guitar, background vocals

Chart performance

Album

Singles

References

1987 albums
Judy Rodman albums
MTM Records albums